Juan Sebastián Herrera Sanabria (born 4 September 1994) is a Colombian professional footballer who plays as a forward for USL Championship side Sacramento Republic.

Career statistics

Club

References

External links
Profile at the Copa Libertadores website

1994 births
Living people
People from Bucaramanga
Colombian footballers
Association football forwards
Alianza Petrolera players
Barranquilla F.C. footballers
Atlético Junior footballers
Jaguares de Córdoba footballers
Atlético Huila footballers
Cortuluá footballers
C.S.D. Macará footballers
Categoría Primera B players
Categoría Primera A players
Ecuadorian Serie A players
Colombian expatriate footballers
Expatriate footballers in Ecuador
Sportspeople from Santander Department
Sacramento Republic FC players